"I'm Good" is a song by American R&B/pop vocal trio Blaque. It was written by Rodney Jerkins, LaShawn Daniels, Fred Jerkins III, and group member Natina Reed, and produced by Rodney Jerkins for Blaque's third studio album Torch. The song was also included on the soundtrack for the film Honey (2003) and released as a single in September 2, 2003. "I'm Good" peaked at number 28 on the Australian ARIA Singles Chart, number 47 on the Swiss Singles Chart, and number 57 on the Austrian Singles Chart. It peaked at number 95 on the Billboard Hot R&B/Hip-Hop Songs chart in November 2003.

Track listings

Notes
  denotes co-producer
  denotes additional producer

Personnel and credits 
Credits adapted from the liner notes of Torch.

 LaShawn Daniels – writer
 Shamari Fears – vocals
 Jean-Marie Horvat – mixing engineer
 Rodney Jerkins – producer, writer

 Fred Jerkins III – writer
 Natina Reed – vocals, writer
 Brandi Williams – vocals

Charts

References

2003 songs
2004 singles
Blaque songs
Music videos directed by Jake Nava
Songs written by Rodney Jerkins
Songs written by Fred Jerkins III
Songs written by LaShawn Daniels
Song recordings produced by Rodney Jerkins
Elektra Records singles